The following events occurred in June 1964:

June 1, 1964 (Monday)
The United States and the Soviet Union signed a bilateral treaty for the first time in 30 years, allowing for the two superpowers to establish consulates in each other's cities.  In addition, it was agreed that if an American citizen was arrested in the USSR, an American consular official would be notified promptly and be given access, and that the same right would apply for a Soviet citizen and a Soviet consular official within the U.S.  The pact was signed at the Spiridonovka Palace in Moscow by Soviet Foreign Minister Andrei Gromyko and U.S. Ambassador to the Soviet Union Foy D. Kohler.

The Kenya Air Force was established under the command of Captain Ian Sargenson Stockwell, formerly of Britain's Royal Air Force.  The RAF base located east of Nairobi at Eastleigh was renamed KAF Eastleigh, and is now Moi Air Base.
The parliament of Cyprus, the majority of whom were Greek Cypriot legislators, voted to pass a law over Turkish protests, allowing the government to establish the Cypriot National Guard and giving it authority to draft Greek Cypriot and Turkish Cypriot citizens.
The first Yaoundé Convention, signed on July 20, 1963, by 18 African nations (Burundi, Cameroon, the Central African Republic, Chad, the Republic of the Congo (Brazzaville), the Republic of the Congo (Leopoldville), Dahomey, Gabon, the Ivory Coast, the Malagasy Republic, Mali, Mauritania, Niger, Rwanda, Senegal, Somalia, Togo, and Upper Volta), went into effect for a five-year period to govern economic relations between the French-speaking nations that had been colonies of either France or Belgium; Somalia had been a UN Trust Territory composed of former British and Italian colonies.  After the expiration on May 31, 1969, a new convention would be signed at Yaoundé on July 29 of that year.
A Canadian Act of Parliament, that had been proposed by Jean Chrétien of Quebec, changed the name of Trans-Canada Air Lines to "Air Canada", effective from January 1, 1965.  The new name needed no translation in either the English or French language.

June 2, 1964 (Tuesday)
The 424 delegates to the Palestinian National Congress ended their meeting in East Jerusalem in Jordan, and approved a National Charter.  Among the articles agreed to were that "Palestine... is an indivisible unit" (Article 2); "Palestinians are those Arab citizens who, until 1947, had normally resided in Palestine" and "anyone born after that date of a Palestinian father" (Article 6); "The partition of Palestine in 1947 and the establishment of Israel are entirely illegal" (Article 17); and "For the realization of the goals of this Charter and its principles, the Palestine Liberation Organization shall perform its complete role in the liberation of Palestine..." (Article 23).
Turkey's council for national security, led by Prime Minister İsmet İnönü, voted to intervene militarily in the Republic of Cyprus, despite objections by Foreign Minister Feridun Cemal Erkin.  U.S. Ambassador to Turkey Raymond Hare was directed by U.S. President Johnson to "meet at once" with İnönü "calling him out of a cabinet if necessary, to express the administration's gravest concern and to urge restraint."  The meeting would take place two days later.
U.S. Senator Barry Goldwater of Arizona narrowly defeated New York Governor Nelson Rockefeller in California's Republican presidential primary, giving him all 86 of California's delegates and placing him "on the threshold of the Republican Presidential nomination." Rockefeller, who had been leading in the early reported returns, conceded defeat the next day.  Goldwater's win was by a margin of less than 59,000 votes out of more than two million cast, with 1,089,133 for Goldwater and 1,030,180 for Rockefeller.  With the California win, Goldwater now had 438 of the necessary 655 votes needed for the nomination.
U.S. President Lyndon Johnson called a White House press conference without advance notice and told reporters that the United States was "bound by solemn commitments" to defend South Vietnam against Communist encroachment, and cited an October 25, 1954 letter from U.S. President Eisenhower to South Vietnam President Ngo Dinh Diem pledging an American promise to protect the Vietnamese government.
Five million shares of stock in the Communications Satellite Corporation (Comsat) were offered for sale at $20 a share, and the issue was quickly sold out.
Lal Bahadur Shastri was unanimously selected by the 537 members of India's ruling Congress Party to become the new Prime Minister of India as the successor of the late Jawaharlal Nehru.

June 3, 1964 (Wednesday)
South Korean President Park Chung Hee declared martial law in Seoul after 10,000 student demonstrators overpowered police.
Kenya and the United Kingdom signed the Defence Agreement of 1964. The Royal Air Force would be able to fly over Kenya, the Royal Navy to put into port at Mombasa, and British forces to train in Kenya twice a year. In return, all British troops in Kenya would be withdrawn by December 12, the British Army would commit to training the Kenya Rifles as a national army, the Royal Air Force would train the newly established Kenya Air Force, and a small Kenya Navy would be established at the end of the year.
In cooperation with the U.S. Air Force and NASA, Lockheed inaugurated the Gemini Extra Care Program to reduce the incidence of equipment failures and discrepancies resulting from poor or careless workmanship during the modification and assembly of the Agena target vehicle. The program included increased inspection, exhortation, morale boosters, special awards, and other activities aimed at fostering and maintaining a strong team spirit at all levels. Results of the program were evidenced in a drastic decline in the number of FEDRs (Failed Equipment and Discrepancy Reports) recorded in the Gemini final manufacturing area on successive vehicles.
Died:
Gustavo C. Garcia, 48, Mexican-American civil rights attorney
Frans Eemil Sillanpää, 75, Finnish writer and 1939 Nobel Prize in Literature laureate

June 4, 1964 (Thursday)
The first Soviet communications satellite, Molniya-1 No.2, was launched at 05:00 UTC, on a Molniya 8K78 carrier rocket, from Site 1/5 at the Baikonur Cosmodrome. A motor circuit in the servo controlling the core stage throttle failed 104 seconds into the flight, resulting in the throttle becoming jammed closed and the fuel supply to the engines being stopped. Prior to the release of information about its mission, NASA had incorrectly identified the launch of Molniya-1 No.2 as a failed attempt to launch a Zond spacecraft on a circumlunar technology demonstration mission, and assigned it the placeholder designation Zond 1964A.
Turkey's Prime Minister İnönü outlined his nation's plan for invading Cyprus in a discussion with U.S. Ambassador Raymond A. Hare, explaining that the mission would simply be to occupy part of the island nation, allowing Greece to occupy the other one-half, and having the United Nations peacekeeping force remain between the two zones. Hare asked İnönü to delay the operation by 24 hours so that he could report back to President Johnson.
Israel and the European Economic Community signed a trade agreement in Brussels. Present at the Ravenstein Hall at the Palais des Congres were Israeli Foreign Minister Golda Meir, foreign trade minister Akiva Govrin, Israel's representative to the EEC Amiel Najar, President of the Commission of the Community Walter Hallstein, and Belgian deputy foreign minister Henri Fayat.
The Beatles began their first, and only, world concert tour starting with a performance at the Tivoli Gardens in Copenhagen, and a second concert two days later at a concert hall in the village of Blokker, Netherlands, followed by visits to Hong Kong, Australia and New Zealand. Because drummer Ringo Starr was hospitalized for acute tonsillitis, Jimmie Nicol took his place for the first eight shows on the tour.
The failing Rolls Razor company's account with Barclays Bank was overdrawn by £485,000. Despite this, John Bloom, managing director, persuaded the company's board of directors to pay out dividends of £209,719.
The United Nations Security Council passed Resolution 189, condemning military incursions into Cambodia.
Dynamic qualification testing of the Gemini ejection seat began with sled test No. 6 at China Lake. This was a preliminary test to prove that hatches and hatch actuators would function properly under abort conditions; no ejection was attempted. The test was successful, and qualification testing proper began on July 1 with test No. 7. The test simulated conditions of maximum dynamic pressure following an abort from the powered phase of Gemini flight, the vehicle being positioned heatshield forward as in reentry. Both seats ejected and all systems functioned as designed. Further sled testing was delayed by slow delivery of pyrotechnics; sled test No. 8 was not run until November 5. This test revealed a structural deficiency in the ejection seat. When the feet of one of the dummies came out of the stirrups, the seat pitched over and yawed to the left, overloading the left side panel. The panel broke off, interrupting the sequence of the ejection system, and the seat and dummy never separated; both seat and dummy were destroyed when they hit the ground. Representatives of Manned Spacecraft Center and McDonnell met during the week of November 15 to consider revising the test program as a result of this failure. They decided to conduct test No. 9 under conditions approximating the most severe for which the ejection system was designed, in order to demonstrate the adequacy of the reworked seat structure. Test No. 9 was run on December 11, successfully demonstrating the entire ejection sequence and confirming the structural redesign. This brought the qualification sled test program to an end.
The crossing of telephone and television lines in the A. T. & T. coaxial cable system caused a disruption for 18 million television viewers across the United States who heard "what may have been the most widely disseminated telephone conversation since Alexander Graham Bell invented the telephone". At 8:13 p.m. Eastern time, people who were watching the NBC television network and a rerun of the series Temple Houston were surprised by two "unsuspecting callers" who were "as nearly as anyone could tell, two women carrying on a friendly conversation somewhere in New York state". Engineers stopped the interference three minutes later, but at 8:45, more of the discussion was heard nationwide by even more viewers tuned into NBC for Dr. Kildare and to ABC for My Three Sons, along with the sound of both programs.

June 5, 1964 (Friday)
Henry Cabot Lodge, the U.S. Ambassador to South Vietnam, sent a cable to President Johnson recommending that the United States not send more ground troops into South Vietnam to fight the Viet Cong. Such a step, he cautioned, would be a "venture of unlimited possibilities which could put us onto a slope along which we slide into a bottomless pit."

U.S. President Johnson sent a secret letter to Turkish Prime Minister İnönü, warning him to call off plans to invade Cyprus. Noting that Turkey's action would begin a war with Greece, "Adhesion to NATO, in its very essence," said the letter, "means that NATO countries will not wage war with each other. Germany and France have buried centuries of animosity and hostility in becoming NATO allies; nothing less can be expected from Greece and Turkey." Adding that a Turkish intervention "could lead to a direct involvement by the Soviet Union", Johnson told İnönü, "I hope you will understand that your NATO allies have not had a chance to consider whether they have an obligation to protect Turkey against the Soviet Union if Turkey takes a step which results in Soviet intervention without the full consent and understanding of its NATO Allies." İnönü would tell his cabinet, "Our friends and our enemies have joined hands against us," and the invasion was called off.
The United States and the Soviet Union announced that they would work together for the first time on a joint project in outer space in the form of a weather satellite network, along with an exchange of data on space biology and medicine.
U.S. Secretary of the Air Force Eugene M. Zuckert announced that three firms, Douglas Aircraft Company, General Electric Company, and The Martin Company, had received authorization to begin work on space station studies. Zuckert predicted also that the Titan III would be test-flown that summer and would launch the Manned Orbiting Laboratory sometime in 1967 or 1968.
The United States Navy commissioned the deep-ocean research submersible DSV Alvin.
Canada's Prime Minister Lester Pearson introduced a resolution in the Canadian House of Commons for a new flag of Canada. Attached to the bill was a picture of his suggestion, "a design with blue borders, a white middle and three maple leaves as on the Canadian coat-of-arms".
Born: Rick Riordan, American author best known for the Percy Jackson & the Olympians series of books; in San Antonio, Texas

June 6, 1964 (Saturday)
Over Laos, Pathet Lao antiaircraft artillery shot down a U.S. Navy RF-8A Crusader photographic reconnaissance aircraft piloted by Lieutenant Charles F. Klusmann.  It was the first U.S. Navy aircraft and first American fixed-wing aircraft to be lost over Indochina in the Vietnam War era.  Klusmann would be taken as a prisoner of war but would escape a few months later.
The Rolling Stones were introduced to the American public in a pre-recorded segment of the ABC television show The Hollywood Palace.  Although they had been flown to Los Angeles for the taping and played three songs, the only part that was televised was a 45-second segment of "I Just Want to Make Love to You" and host Dean Martin made derogatory remarks about the Stones, including "Their hair is not long.  It's just smaller foreheads and higher eyebrows."
Died: 
Guy Banister, 63, FBI agent cited during the 1967 Trial of Clay Shaw as part of the conspiracy to kill John F. Kennedy.
Robert Warwick, 85, American stage, film and television actor

June 7, 1964 (Sunday)
Jack Ruby, who had killed accused presidential assassin Lee Harvey Oswald, testified before the Warren Commission.  Since Ruby had been imprisoned since November 24, the questioning took place at the interrogation room of the Dallas County Jail, with Chief Justice Earl Warren and U.S. Congressman Gerald R. Ford from the commission, and began at 11:45 in the morning and lasted for three hours. "I would like to be able to get a lie detector test or truth serum of what motivated me to do what I did at that particular time," Ruby began, "and it seems as you get further into something, even though you know what you did, it operates against you somehow, brainwashes you, that you are weak in what you want to tell the truth and what you want to say which is the truth."
The Taça das Nações football tournament, held in Brazil to celebrate the fiftieth anniversary of the founding of the Brazilian Football Confederation, was won by Argentina.
Died: 
Violet Attlee, Countess Attlee, 68, wife of former British PM Clement Attlee, from a cerebral haemorrhage 
Charlie Llewellyn, 87, the first non-white South African Test cricketer (1896 to 1912)

June 8, 1964 (Monday)
The UN Trust territory of Papua New Guinea, administered by Australia, convened its first elected legislature, the 64-member House of Assembly of Papua and New Guinea.  Previously, the south Pacific islands had been governed by an appointed legislative council. Under the provisions of Australia's Papua and New Guinea Act, 44 of the members were indigenous residents voted upon by people within a geographic electorate, 10 were non-indigenous from special electorates, and the other 10 were appointed by the Governor-General of Australia on the recommendation of the Papua New Guinean administrator.
The entire complement of NASA astronauts began Gemini launch abort training on the Ling-Temco-Vought simulator. Group 1 (selected April 1959) and Group 2 (September 1962) astronauts averaged approximately 100 runs each whereas Group 3 (October 1963) astronauts completed 32 runs apiece. The Gemini-Titan 3 launch profile was simulated in detail, including such cues as noise, vibration, pitch and roll programming, and other motion cues which resulted from various launch anomalies. The training was completed July 30.
Twenty-eight people in the northwestern part of the U.S. state of Montana were killed, and 115 missing, after the bursts of two dams sent the waters of the Sun River at a depth of up to  through entire towns, including Choteau, Montana.
A 15-year-old boy in Gila Bend, Arizona, Gerald Gault, was arrested after being accused by Mrs. Ora Cook of having made an obscene phone call, and placed in the county's juvenile detention center without notice to either of his parents. One week later he was sentenced by Judge Robert McGhee to six years incarceration, even though the maximum sentence for an adult for the same crime would have been no more than two months in jail and a $50 fine. The parents' appeal of the sentence would lead to the landmark U.S. Supreme Court decision on May 15, 1967, in the case of In re Gault, requiring that minor children be afforded the same due process rights as adults.
Born: Fabrizio Cassol, Belgian saxophonist, first to use the aulochrome; in Ougrée

June 9, 1964 (Tuesday)
A federal court jury in Kansas City, Kansas, found army deserter George John Gessner guilty of passing United States secrets to the Soviet Union and sentenced him to life imprisonment.  Private Gessner had fled from Fort Bliss in Texas on December 6, 1960 and, two days later, went to the Soviet embassy in Mexico City.  He would admit that a month later, in January 1961, he had sold operational and design details of the Mark 7 nuclear bomb, the 280 mm atomic cannon and the 8-inch atomic mortar, in return for a payment of $200.  However, his conviction would be reversed on findings that his confession had been made under duress and, on March 8, 1966, the U.S. Department of Justice would drop the charges because "the government had no case against Gessner without a confession."

Lal Bahadur Shastri was sworn in as Prime Minister of India, becoming "the second man to rule modern India" since its independence from the United Kingdom.  He would serve for a year and a half before his sudden death on January 11, 1966, during a summit in the Soviet Union. In his inaugural broadcast to the nation,"There comes a time in the life of every nation when it stands at the cross-roads of history and must choose which way to go. But for us there need be no difficulty or hesitation, no looking to right or left. Our way was straight and clear—the building up of a socialist democracy at home with freedom and prosperity for all, and the maintenance of world peace and friendship with all nations."
Born: 
Wayman Tisdale, American basketball player; in Fort Worth, Texas (died of cancer, 2009)
Elena Andrianovna Nikolaeva-Tereshkova, the first child to be born to two space travelers; in Moscow.  Her mother, Valentina Tereshkova, was in orbit space almost a year earlier on Vostok 6, and her father, Andriyan Nikolayev had been on Vostok 3 in August 1962. 
Died: Lord Beaverbrook, 85, Canadian-born newspaper publisher and politician

June 10, 1964 (Wednesday)
The U.S. Senate voted, 71 to 29, for a cloture to end the longest filibuster in Senate history, 75 days after long opposition speeches by opponents of the Civil Rights Act of 1964. A cloture vote required at least two-thirds of the Senators present, or 67 votes, to pass. U.S. Senator Robert C. Byrd of West Virginia had completed the last of the filibuster speeches at 9:51 in the morning, 14 hours and 13 minutes after he had started at 7:38 the previous evening. The vote marked only the fifth time that cloture had been voted and cleared the way for approval of the bill. Twenty-three Democrats and six Republicans opposed the cloture vote, with 23 of the 24 southern senators, along with Byrd from West Virginia, one each from Nevada, Utah, New Mexico, Wyoming and South Dakota, and both from Arizona, including Republican presidential candidate Barry Goldwater.
Air Force Space Systems Division's cost-plus-fixed-fee contract with Martin for 15 Gemini launch vehicles (GLV) and associated aerospace ground equipment was replaced by a cost-plus-incentive-fee contract. Contract negotiations had been conducted between March 15 and April 30, 1964. The final contract contained cost, performance, and schedule incentives. Target cost was $111 million and target fee was $8.88 million. The maximum fee possible under the contract was $16.65 million as against a minimum of $3.33 million. The period of performance under the contract was July 1, 1963, through December 31, 1967, and covered the delivery of 14 GLVs (one GLV had already been delivered) and associated equipment and services, including checkout and launch.
The Convention on the Continental Shelf entered into force after having been ratified by 22 of the 46 nations whose representatives had signed it in Geneva on April 29, 1958.
Born: Ben Daniels, English stage and television actor; in Nuneaton, Warwickshire

June 11, 1964 (Thursday)
In the suburb of Volkhoven in Cologne, West Germany, Walter Seifert attacked students and teachers at a Roman Catholic elementary school with a homemade flamethrower, killing 10 and injuring 21.  Screaming "Hitler the second has returned!" he set fire to a classroom building with ignited fuel, then torched two other buildings before his fuel supply was spent.  Seifert died after being shot by police.
The Equal Pay Act of 1963 took effect in the United States, prohibiting wage discrimination by any American employer who was subject to the minimum wage requirements of the Fair Labor Standards Act.
The new RSFSR Civil Code, governing the rules for lawsuits and other non-criminal proceedings in courts in the Russian SFSR, went into effect in the largest of the Soviet Union's 15 socialist republic, in what is now the Russian Federation.
Brazil's first Institutional Act (the Ato Institucional), promulgated on April 9, expired under its own terms, after President Humberto Castelo Branco had removed 378 public officials from office and suspended their political rights for 10 years.  Those affected included 300 local legislators at the state and municipal level; 63 national deputies and two national senators; six state governors; and former presidents João Goulart, Jânio Quadros, and Juscelino Kubitschek.  Castelo Branco also fired more than 10,000 civil servants, and retired 77 army officers, 14 navy officers, and 31 air force officers.  Investigations continued, however, with the creation the same month of the SNI, the Serviço Nacional de Informações or National Information Service, to spy on Brazil's civilians.
Died: Plaek Phibunsongkhram, 66, Prime Minister of Thailand from 1938 to 1944, and from 1948 to 1957

June 12, 1964 (Friday)
East Germany and the Soviet Union signed a 20-year "treaty of friendship" in Moscow but stopped short of a formal peace treaty declaring an end to the USSR's war with Germany during World War II. The agreement stated that the two nations considered West Berlin to be "an independent political unit" rather than a part of West Germany. Soviet premier Nikita Khrushchev and East German Chancellor Walter Ulbricht executed the pact in Moscow. The United States, United Kingdom and France would respond on June 26 with a rejection of the Communist description of West Berlin's status.
Nelson Mandela and seven co-defendants (Walter Sisulu, Ahmed Kathrada, Govan Mbeki, Denis Goldberg, Raymond Mhlaba, Andrew Mlangeni and Elias Motsoaledi) were sentenced to life imprisonment. Goldberg would be sent to Pretoria, while Mandela and the other black defendants went to the Robben Island prison. Mandela would not be released until 1990, and would later be elected as the first black President of South Africa.
Pennsylvania Governor William Scranton announced his candidacy for the Republican presidential nomination, as part of a movement to stop Barry Goldwater from receiving the nomination. By then, Goldwater had picked up 114 more delegates from other states after California, for 562 convention votes, just 93 short of the 655 needed to get the nomination. The next day, he would receive 42 more votes from four more states to reach 618.
Representatives of NASA, McDonnell, Weber Aircraft, and Air Force 6511th Test Group met to define the basic objectives of a program to demonstrate the functional reliability of the Gemini personnel recovery system under simulated operational conditions. Such a program had been suggested at a coordination meeting on the ejection seat system on October 30, 1963. The planned program called for the recovery system to be ejected from an F-106 aircraft, beginning with a static ground test in September, to demonstrate compatibility between the recovery system and the aircraft. Two full system tests, using a production configuration recovery system, would complete the program in about a month. The program was delayed by the unavailability of pyrotechnics. The static ground test was successfully conducted October 15, using pyrotechnics from the paraglider tow test vehicle (TTV) seat. The TTV seat pyrotechnics were adequate to demonstrate system/aircraft compatibility but lacked certain items required for full system test. Full system testing accordingly did not begin until January 28, 1965.
Christopher C. Kraft, Jr., Assistant Director for Flight Operations, Manned Spacecraft Center, reported that three basic plans were under study for Project Gemini rendezvous missions. Rendezvous at first apogee would probably be rejected because of possible dispersions which might necessitate plane changes. Rendezvous from concentric orbits seemed to be desirable because of the freedom in selection of the geographic position of rendezvous. Major work thus far, however, had been expended on the tangential rendezvous. Subsequently, the concentric orbit plan was chosen for Gemini-Titan 6, the first rendezvous mission.

June 13, 1964 (Saturday)
The first 300 volunteers for the "Freedom Summer" project, to register African-Americans to vote in Mississippi, arrived at the campus of the Western College for Women in Oxford, Ohio.  They received instruction from members of the Mississippi chapters of the Student Nonviolent Coordinating Committee (SNCC), the Congress of Racial Equality (CORE), the National Association for the Advancement of Colored People (NAACP) and the Southern Christian Leadership Conference (SCLC). 
Sir Richard Luyt, the colonial Governor of British Guiana (now Guyana) proclaimed a state of emergency and ordered the arrest of 28 politicians and trade union leaders, in the wake of escalating violence arising from a strike of sugar workers.
Born: Kathy Burke, English actress, comedian, playwright and theatre director; in London

June 14, 1964 (Sunday)
The government of Romania announced that the Communist nation had released 7,674 political prisoners and that the ruling Romanian Communist Party had plans for a general pardon of "practically all" remaining prisoners of conscience in August.  The news came in a statement given by Deputy Premier Alexandru Bârlădeanu.
More than 100 fans of The Beatles required hospital treatment for their injuries when 250,000 people turned out at Melbourne to welcome the British group to its first visit to Australia.
Abdirizak Haji Hussein became the new Prime Minister of Somalia, replacing A. A. Shermarke after the Somali Youth League party lost 14 seats in the March 30 election.  Hussein would be fired on June 10, 1967, after Shermarke's election as President of Somalia.
Czechoslovakia held parliamentary elections in which voters were asked to vote for or against the list of 100 National Front (Národní fronta or Národný front) candidates for the National Assembly of Czechoslovakia.
After 18 days, the National Army of Colombia successfully completed its "Operation Marquetalia", the destruction of the "Marquetalia Republic", a leftist guerrilla stronghold in the rural Colombian departamento of Huila. The guerrillas and their allies were dispersed, and anything they left behind was destroyed by the soldiers.
Beatnik author Ken Kesey and his friends, the Merry Pranksters, departed from their commune at La Honda, California, on their bus "Furthur", on a journey across the United States to the New York World's Fair.  The purpose of the trip was for the riders to experience the American road while high on the hallucinogenic drug LSD, which had not yet been outlawed.  Author Tom Wolfe would later profile the trip in his bestselling book, The Electric Kool-Aid Acid Test.
The 1964 Belgian Grand Prix motor race, held at the Circuit de Spa-Francorchamps, was won by Jim Clark.

June 15, 1964 (Monday)
In its decision in Reynolds v. Sims, the U.S. Supreme Court ruled, 8 to 1, that the legislative systems of six American states (New York, Maryland, Alabama, Colorado, Virginia and Delaware) were unconstitutional because the apportionment of their districts did not reflect an apportionment of a roughly equal number of people, thus violating the 14th Amendment guarantee of equal protection under the law.  The new standards announced by the Court were such that nearly all 50 states would have to reform the apportionment systems of their state senatorial districts to reflect an equal distribution of the population, something not required of the United States Senate.
The Group of 77 (G77) was formed by developing nations who were members of the United Nations, with the signing of the  "Joint Declaration of the Seventy-Seven Countries" at the United Nations Conference on Trade and Development.  The founders were almost all of the African, South American and Central American nations, almost all of the Middle Eastern nations (except for Israel), and nearly all of the East Asian nations (except for the People's Republic of China and Australia).
Born: 
Courteney Cox, American actress; in Birmingham, Alabama
Michael Laudrup, Danish footballer and manager; in Frederiksberg

June 16, 1964 (Tuesday)
Keith Bennett, a 12-year-old boy, was abducted by Myra Hindley and Ian Brady. Bennett vanished on his way to his grandmother's house in Longsight. Hindley lured him into her Mini pick-up, in which Brady was sitting, by asking for help in loading some boxes, after which she said she would drive the boy home. She drove to a lay-by on Saddleworth Moor, and Brady went off with Bennett, supposedly looking for a lost glove. Hindley kept watch, and after about 30 minutes Brady reappeared, alone and carrying a spade that he had hidden there earlier. When Hindley asked how he had killed Bennett, Brady said that he had sexually assaulted the boy and strangled him with a piece of string.
The bus was traveling north on the world's longest bridge, and had traveled  along the Causeway when it encountered the hole at shortly after 1:45 in the morning. Only 8 people were on board the early morning bus, on their way to Jackson, Mississippi from New Orleans, and six of them drowned. The barges were being pushed by the towboat Rebel Jr.; the helmsman of the tugboat said later that he had "fainted and apparently fell against a steering lever which drove the tug and its barges" into the bridge.
Meeting in Dallas, the 11,000 participants at the Republican state convention in Texas pledged the state's 56 delegates to U.S. Senator Barry Goldwater, while Arkansas pledged 9 of its 12 delegates to the Arizona senator, bringing his total to 660, five more than the 655 needed to clinch the Republican Party nomination in the 1964 presidential race.
Lockheed began test-firing the propulsion test vehicle assembly at its Santa Cruz Test Base, after a delay caused primarily by problems with the Agena main engine start tanks. The program, undertaken because of extensive changes in the propulsion system required to adapt the standard Agena D for use in Gemini missions, comprised three series of static-firing tests. The first series, in addition to providing base line performance for both primary and secondary propulsion systems (PPS and SPS), also subjected one SPS module to the dynamic and acoustic environment created by 55 seconds of PPS firing. The second series, successfully completed July 16, simulated a possible Gemini mission profile, including multiple firings and various coast and burn times on both PPS and SPS units. The third series, which concluded the test program on August 7, involved a maximum number of starts and minimum-impulse firings on both PPS and SPS. All firings were successful, and review of test data revealed only minor anomalies. The entire test program comprised 27 PPS firings for a run time totaling 545 seconds, 30 SPS Unit I firings totaling 286 seconds, and 11 SPS Unit II firings totaling 268 seconds. Post-test disassembly revealed no physical damage to any equipment.

June 17, 1964 (Wednesday)
A missing persons investigation was launched in Fallowfield, Manchester, as police searched for twelve-year-old Keith Bennett, who went missing on the previous evening. The boy's stepfather, Jimmy Johnson, became a suspect; in the two years following Bennett's disappearance, Johnson was taken for questioning on four occasions. Detectives searched under the floorboards of the Johnsons' house, and on discovering that the houses in the row were connected, extended the search to the entire street.
American author Ken Kesey and his Merry Pranksters embarked on a cross-country trip aboard a bus called Further, spreading the gospel of LSD.
Air Force Space Systems Division's cost-plus-fixed-fee contract with Aerojet-General for engines and related aerospace ground equipment for the Gemini launch vehicle was replaced by a cost-plus-incentive-fee contract. Contract negotiations had been conducted between May 25 and June 17, 1964. The final contract covered the procurement of 14 sets of engines (one set had already been delivered) and associated equipment during the period from July 1, 1963, through December 31, 1967. Cost, performance, and schedule incentives made possible a maximum fee of $5,885,250 versus a minimum fee of $1,177,050. The initial target cost was $39,235,000 with a target fee of $3,138,800.
California's Motor Vehicle Pollution Control Board forced automobile manufacturers to comply with the state's new regulations requiring motor vehicles to include a catalytic converter or another type of vehicle emissions control device, a few days after a spokesman for the U.S. Automobile Manufacturers Association said that GM, Ford and Chrysler would not be able to include the technology for at least two years. California had become the first state in the United States to require emissions control devices on all cars sold within its borders, and to counteract the delays by the nation's automakers, the MVPCP certified four devices from other vendors. "Faced with the prospect of installing devices made by third parties on their own cars," it would be written later, the car makers would decide on August 12 to create their own devices within a year.
Died: Joel S. Goldsmith, 72, American spiritual healer and founder of "The Infinite Way" movement

June 18, 1964 (Thursday)
The first telephone cable between Japan and the United States was inaugurated with a phone call between U.S. President Johnson (in Washington) and Japan Prime Minister Hayato Ikeda in Tokyo.  A joint venture between AT&T and the Japanese telephone company Kokusai Denshin Denwa (KDD), the 5,300-mile long undersea cable was laid between Tokyo and Honolulu and gave Japan direct-line communications for the first time between Japan and North America, Europe and Australia.
Marshal Rodion Malinovsky, Defense Minister for the Soviet Union, signed orders starting the development of the first Soviet space station, the Soyuz-R.
The typhoid epidemic in Aberdeen, in which 507 people had been sent to hospitals from bacteria traced to a single can of corned beef, was declared to be at an end, more than a month after the first case had been detected on May 12.
Died: Giorgio Morandi, 73, Italian painter and printmaker

June 19, 1964 (Friday)
Prime Minister İsmet İnönü narrowly survived a motion of no confidence in the Grand National Assembly of Turkey, but by only six votes, 200 to 206.
Senator Edward Kennedy, 32, and Senator Birch Bayh, 36, were seriously injured in a private plane crash at Southampton, Massachusetts. The pilot, Edward J. Zimny, was killed. Accompanied by a Kennedy aide and by Mrs. Bayh, the two U.S. Senators were flying from Washington, D.C., to attend the Massachusetts Democratic state convention in West Springfield when the twin-engine Aero Commander plunged into an apple orchard. Kennedy broke his back and would be hospitalized for nearly six months, until December 16.
Earlier in the day, the 1964 Civil Rights Act was approved by the United States Senate by a vote of 73 to 27. All of the votes against the bill came from the same U.S. Senators who had voted no in the 71-29 approval against ending the filibuster against the bill, including Republican presidential candidate Barry Goldwater of Arizona, who had opposed the measure as an unconstitutional usurpation of state powers by the federal government, rather than on opposition to the rights of African-Americans. U.S. Senators Alan Bible of Nevada and Carl Hayden of Arizona, who had voted against cloture, both voted in favor of the Civil Rights Act.
U.S. President Johnson presided over the groundbreaking ceremonies for the Bay Area Rapid Transit (BART) system in Concord, California. Criticizing Barry Goldwater's views on states' rights, Johnson talked about the federally-aided transit system serving San Francisco and Oakland and said, "The idea that we are 50 separate countries, that the federal government— representing the destiny of 190 million people— does not have duty to meet the needs of these people— this idea is as out of date as the dinosaur."
Stage I of Gemini launch vehicle 3 was erected in the vertical test facility at Martin-Baltimore. Stage II was erected June 22. Power was first applied June 29, and subsystems functional verification testing concluded July 31.
The last original episode of The Twilight Zone, the CBS science fiction anthology series, was telecast with the showing of "The Bewitchin' Pool".
Born: Boris Johnson, Prime Minister of the United Kingdom from 2019 to 2022; as Alexander Boris de Pfeffel Johnson in New York City. Johnson's parents, Stanley Johnson and Charlotte Fawcett Johnson (later Charlotte Johnson Wahl), had moved from Britain to Manhattan in 1963 while Stanley was a student at Columbia University.

June 20, 1964 (Saturday)
Civil Air Transport Flight 106, a Curtiss C-46-CU operated by the Taiwanese airline Civil Air Transport, crashed near the Fengyuan in western Taiwan, killing all 57 people aboard. Among the dead were 20 Americans, one Briton, and members of the Malaysian delegation to the 11th Film Festival in Asia, including businessman Loke Wan Tho and his wife Mavis. The plane had taken off from Taichung 10 minutes earlier and then exploded.
U.S. Army Lt. General William C. Westmoreland took command of Military Assistance Command, Vietnam (MACV), succeeding retiring General Paul D. Harkins.  During his four-year command, the number of American troops that he requested for the Vietnam War would increase twenty-fold, from less than 25,000 to more than 500,000 and he would continue to guide the conduct of the war as Chief of Staff of the United States Army from 1968 to 1972.

June 21, 1964 (Sunday)
The kidnapping and murder of three civil rights activists — Michael Schwerner, 24, and Andrew Goodman, 20, both white New Yorkers, and James Chaney, 21, a black local resident — took place near Philadelphia, Mississippi. The three had left Meridian at 9:00 to travel 40 miles north to Philadelphia to investigate the burning of a church, and failed to return to Meridian at 4:00 that afternoon. After investigating the burning of the Mount Zion Methodist Church in Neshoba County, the three passed through Philadelphia and were arrested by Deputy Sheriff Cecil Price and taken to jail. They were released at 10:30 that night and allowed to drive back toward Meridian under a police escort, then guided to a side road where all three were shot by Alton Wayne Roberts and James Jordan. Under the direction of Deputy Price, the three were buried in an earthen dam. Their bodies would remain undiscovered until August 4.
The Chess interzonal championship ended in a four-way tie in Amsterdam as Denmark's grandmaster, Bent Larsen, finished with 17 points along with three Soviet grandmasters, former world champions Vassily Smyslov and Mikhail Tal, and future world champion Boris Spassky. The final score was reported as "Larsen, Smyslov, Spassky, and Tal 17".
Spain beat the Soviet Union, 2–1, to win the 1964 European Nations Cup in front of a crowd of 120,000 people at Madrid.
Jim Bunning pitched the first perfect game in the National League in 84 years, guiding the Philadelphia Phillies to a 6–0 win over the New York Mets. With no hits, no errors, and no men reaching base, Bunning retired 27 batters. Second baseman Tony Taylor helped save the perfect game in the 5th inning when he dived for a grounder by the Mets' Jesse Gonder and was able to keep Gonder from reaching first base. It marked only the 8th perfect game in major league baseball up to that time. John Montgomery Ward of the Providence Grays had pitched a perfect game on June 17, 1880, in a 5–0 win over the Buffalo Bisons. Bunning would later be elected as a U.S. Representative and then a U.S. Senator from Kentucky.
The École Freudienne de Paris was founded by psychoanalyst Jacques Lacan after his recognition was withdrawn by the International Psychoanalytical Association.
Born: 
Patrice Bailly-Salins, French biathlete who won the 1995 sprint world championship in 1995; in Morez
Dean Saunders, Welsh footballer and striker on the Wales national team from 1986 to 2001; in Swansea

June 22, 1964 (Monday)
In the Ashes, the annual test cricket series between England and Australia, batsman John Edrich was first up for England and scored 120 runs before being retired. Despite a 246 to 176 lead for England after the first of two innings, the second Test at Lord's Cricket Ground ended in a draw the next day because of heavy rains.
Abe Segal of South Africa defeated Clark Graebner of the U.S. in the first round of Wimbledon in straight sets, 6–2, 7–5, 6–2. The tennis match made headlines worldwide because the line umpire, Dorothy Cavis-Brown, had fallen asleep and did not call the match point when Graebner's shot was out by a couple of feet. Graebner laughed and conceded the point, and the crowd laughed as Cavis-Brown, who was exhausted from overwork, continued sleeping until a ball boy woke her up.
A Gemini Recovery School began operations at Kindley Air Force Base, Bermuda. Conducted by the Landing and Recovery Division of Flight Operations Directorate, this was the first such training course for Gemini offered to recovery personnel. The group included pararescue crews, Air Force navigators, and maintenance personnel.
 In Cooper v. Pate, the U.S. Supreme Court ruled in a 100-word opinion that state prison inmates had standing to bring lawsuits in federal courts and, by extension, in individual state courts as well. The U.S. District Court in Chicago was ordered to hear Thomas X. Cooper's complaints that he had been deprived of his civil rights by the warden of the Stateville Correctional Center, and a year later, that court would rule in his favor on most of the complaints, in what "marked a turning point for inmates, not only in Illinois but around the country... Before Cooper, all power in prison had flowed from the wardens. Now it flowed from the courts." Thousands of civil rights lawsuits would be filed by inmates and "the nation's prisons, many of them truly awful places, were vastly improved."
The Supreme Court also decided Jacobellis v. Ohio, determining that a U.S. state could not ban the exhibition of a film simply on the opinion of a state official that the film was obscene, without due process. In a 6 to 3 ruling, the justices held that Louis Malle's award-winning 1958 French film, The Lovers, but could not agree on a definition of what obscenity was. Four different opinions were written for the majority, with only Arthur Goldberg concurring with William J. Brennan's opinion; and two dissenting opinions were made. The case was famous for the statement by Justice Potter Stewart about "hard-core pornography", which all agreed was not protected by the First Amendment guarantee of freedom of speech. Stewart wrote, "I shall not today attempt further to define the kinds of material I understand to be embraced within that shorthand description; and perhaps I could never succeed in intelligibly doing so. But I know it when I see it..."
Born:
Hiroshi Abe, Japanese film actor; in Yokohama
Amy Brenneman, American TV actress best known for the title role in Judging Amy; in New London, Connecticut
Dan Brown, American author of The Da Vinci Code; in Exeter, New Hampshire
Miroslav Kadlec, Czech soccer football defender who played for the Czechoslovakian national team 1987 to 1993 and the Czech Republic team 1994–1997; in Uherské Hradiště, Czechoslovakia

June 23, 1964 (Tuesday)
Jack Kilby was awarded U.S. Patent No. 3,138,743 (filed on February 6, 1959) for his invention of the miniature integrated circuit that made portable electronic devices, including hand-held computers, possible.  Kilby, along with Robert Noyce (who invented an integrated circuit independently of Kilby) would be awarded the Nobel Prize in Physics in 2000.
The station wagon belonging to Schwerner, Goodman and Chaney was found, burned, roughly 100 feet off of Mississippi Highway 21 in Neshoba County, roughly 15 miles northeast of Philadelphia, Mississippi. There was no trace of the three men.
Born: Lou Yun, Chinese gymnast and 1987 vaulting world champion; in Hangzhou

June 24, 1964 (Wednesday)
The U.S. Federal Trade Commission issued a ruling requiring that all cigarette package labels should, by January 1, include a warning, displayed "clearly and prominently", that cigarette smoking could cause death from cancer and other diseases. The FTC added that cigarette advertising would be required to include the warning by July 1, 1965. The original warning, as required by Congress in 1965, was "Cigarette Smoking May be Hazardous to Your Health."
Construction of Gemini-Agena facilities at complex 14 was completed. General Dynamics finished the installation and checkout of equipment in the Launch Operations Building on July 20. Lockheed equipment in the Launch Operations Building was installed and checked out by July 31.
Born: Christopher Steele, British intelligence officer and investigator; to British parents in Aden, Federation of South Arabia
Died: Stuart Davis, 71, American painter

June 25, 1964 (Thursday)
Eduardo Mondlane, leader of FRELIMO (Frente de Libertação de Moçambique), the Mozambique Liberation Front, announced the beginning of a guerrilla war against the colonial leaders of Portuguese East Africa. Portuguese agents would assassinate Mondlane in 1969, but FRELIMO would ultimately sign the Lusaka Accord on September 7, 1974, after ten years of war. Portugal would grant Mozambique independence on June 25, 1975.
In parliamentary elections for Swaziland, still a British protectorate surrounded by South Africa, the Imbokodvo National Movement won all eight of the "open" seats reserved for black Africans. The United Swaziland Association won the four reserved and four European seats for white candidates, and another eight seats went to traditional chiefs.
Prince Albert Taylor, Jr. became the first African-American bishop of the Methodist Church to be assigned to a primarily white American congregation, becoming the bishop for New Jersey. He was followed two weeks later, on July 10, by the appointment of James Samuel Thomas as the bishop for Iowa.
Martin-Baltimore received the propellant tanks for Gemini launch vehicle (GLV) 5 from Martin-Denver, which had begun fabrication in October 1963. Aerojet-General delivered the flight engines for GLV-5 November 5. Tank splicing was completed December 5; engine installation December 9. Final horizontal tests were completed January 7, 1965.
A lunar eclipse was visible from South America and Africa, seen as rising over North America, and setting over Europe and Western Asia.
Born: Johnny Herbert, English racing driver and winner of 24 Hours of Le Mans in 1991; in Brentwood, Essex
Died:
Princess Auguste of Bavaria, 89
Raymond G. McCarthy, 63, American expert on alcoholism and Yale University professor who pioneered the treatment of alcoholism as a disease. In 1953, his study concluded that at least 3,000,000 Americans were alcoholic, out of 68 million who consumed alcohol.
Gerrit Rietveld, 76, Dutch architect and designer

June 26, 1964 (Friday)
A U.S. Air Force LC-130 Hercules transport plane, specially equipped with landing skis, became the first aircraft to land in Antarctica during its winter season, when storms generally make the continent inaccessible. Piloted by Navy Lt. R. V. Mayer and carrying a team of medical specialists from Bethesda Naval Hospital, the plane arrived at McMurdo Station "on an ice runway just cleared of fresh snow" after an eight-and-a-half-hour flight from Christchurch, New Zealand, for the final leg of a  journey that had started two days earlier from Quonset, Rhode Island, and took off later in the morning. The hazardous mission was undertaken after a member of the Navy's Seabees construction battalion, Petty Officer Bethel L. McMullen, had been seriously injured in a fall.
Moise Tshombe returned to the Democratic Republic of the Congo after a one-year exile in Spain. Congolese President Joseph Mobutu requested that the former Prime Minister, who had once led an attempted secession, return in order to prevent a rebellion in the east, and sent Belgian journalist Pierre Davister to convey the invitation.
Near Marshalls Creek, Pennsylvania, six people were killed, and 10 injured, in the blast of a truck hauling  of explosives. The driver had been transporting a cargo for the American Cyanamid company when he had a blowout of two tires, then kept driving until he could find a place to pull off the road. His tires were smoldering as he detached the cab from the trailer, and, while he was driving down the road to find a payphone, the truck caught fire. Three volunteer firemen were killed in the explosion of nitro carbon nitrate (NCN) and gelatin dynamite, along with a nearby resident, a passing motorist, and another truck driver who had spotted the fire. The driver would later be acquitted in a trial for involuntary manslaughter.
Born: Zeng Jinlian, Chinese victim of gigantism, verified (at 8'1" or 246.3 cm) as the tallest woman in history; in Yujiang village, Hunan province (d. 1982)

June 27, 1964 (Saturday)
On completion of a series of exhumations at the former Jasenovac concentration camp in Croatia, it was estimated that the grounds of Donja Gradina held the remains of 366,000 victims of anti-Serbian extermination practices during the Second World War.  In 1989 Serbian anthropologist Srboljub Živanović would publish what he claimed were the full results of the 1964 studies, which in his words had been "suppressed by Tito's government in the name of brotherhood and unity, in order to put less emphasis on the crimes of the Croatian Ustaše".
Singer Ethel Merman and TV actor Ernest Borgnine were married at his home in Beverly Hills, California, then set off on a honeymoon in Asia before Borgnine's scheduled July 27 obligation to begin filming the new season of his TV show, McHale's Navy.  The two would be married for only 38 days before separating on August 4, and would divorce by November.
Born: Kai Diekmann, German journalist and the chief editor of the tabloid Bild, 2001–2015; in Bielefeld, West Germany
Died: Mona Barrie, 54, English-born film actress

June 28, 1964 (Sunday)
Greece and Bulgaria signed 12 agreements to settle all pending disputes between the two nations, including the payment by Bulgaria to Greece of seven million dollars of war reparations arising from World War II, when Bulgaria had been part of the Axis powers invading Greece.
The 1964 French Grand Prix was held at the Rouen-Les-Essarts circuit and was won by Jim Clark.
A body found in the United Kingdom, in the woods near Bracknell, led to a significant case in the history of the use of entomology to assist criminal investigations. By studying the maggots found on the body, forensic entomologist Professor Keith Simpson was able to establish the date of death at around June 16. Missing persons records for that date led the police to believe that the body was that of Peter Thomas, who had gone missing from his home in Lydney. William Brittle, a business partner of Thomas, would subsequently be convicted of the murder.
France's Foreign Minister Maurice Couve de Murville participated in the live TV news interview program to be transmitted across the Atlantic Ocean. Speaking from a studio in Paris to the New York moderators on the NBC show Meet the Press, Couve cautioned that the United States could not win the Vietnam War if it increased its involvement. "This is not an ordinary war," he said.  "That means a war you can just settle by victory or defeat.  It is not that simple.... the problem cannot be settled by military means but should be settled by political means."
Britt Sullivan, a 29-year-old veteran of the U.S. Navy's WAVES program, disappeared in shark-infested waters on the third day of her attempt at a trans-Atlantic swim between New York and England. The skipper of her escort boat, the Marine Center, told the U.S. Coast Guard that she had been pulled from the water "because a big school of sharks came within 30 yards of her" and that "a short time later she reentered the water and began swimming once again". Sullivan, whose journey had started on Friday from Coney Island, had planned "to swim 18 hours a day and rest six" on the  journey. The Coast Guard would abandon its search after two days after finding no trace of Ms. Sullivan.
Malcolm X announced the creation of the Organization of Afro-American Unity in a speech at the Audubon Ballroom in New York. He would be assassinated in the same ballroom less than eight months later, on February 21, 1965.
Born:
Mark Grace, American baseball player and first baseman; in Winston-Salem, North Carolina
Tommy Lynn Sells, American serial killer; in Oakland, California (executed 2013)
Died: Eduards Kalniņš, 87, Latvian general

June 29, 1964 (Monday)
New Zealand began its first military involvement in the Vietnam War by deploying a 25-man contingent of the New Zealand Army at the Tan Son Nhut airport near Saigon.
The People's Republic of China successfully tested the Dongfeng-2, its first medium range ballistic missile, a few months before it exploded its first atomic bomb.
Manx Radio became the first radio station on the Isle of Man in the United Kingdom, as a 50-watt FM station with studios in the island's capital at Douglas.  As Radio Vannin, it also provided the first Manx language radio programs, which were on for a few hours a week in addition to its English programming.
Died: Eric Dolphy, 36, African-American jazz saxophonist, died in West Berlin during a European tour, from complications of diabetes.

June 30, 1964 (Tuesday)
UNOC, the United Nations Operation in the Congo, came to an end with the withdrawal of the last UN peacekeeping troops from the former Belgian Congo after four years. Major General Johnson Aguiyi-Ironsi, commander of the first Nigerian Battalion and the future President of Nigeria, was the last of the 143 UN men on the force to board the chartered plane. His 85-member contingent, and the 58 men of the 57th division of the Canadian Army, were the only remaining UN forces, whose departure coincided with the resignation of Congolese premier Cyrille Adoula.
McDonnell conducted the first of two tests to qualify the Gemini spacecraft for water impact landing. Static article No. 4 was dropped from the landing system test rig heatshield forward and incurred no damage. In the second test, on July 13, the unit was dropped conical section forward. A pressure decay test of the cabin after the drop indicated a very small leak.

References

1964
1964-06
1964-06